All You Need Is Love: The Story of Popular Music is the name of a 17-part television documentary series on the history of modern pop music directed by Tony Palmer, originally broadcast worldwide between 1976 and 1980. The series covers some of the many different genres that have fallen under the "pop" label between the mid-19th century and 1976, including folk, ragtime, Tin Pan Alley, vaudeville and music hall, musical theatre, country, swing, jazz, blues, R&B, rock 'n' roll and others.

All You Need Is Love was born out of the reaction to his 1968 Omnibus episode on popular music called All My Loving which presented the music of the 1960s with no reference to the musical forms that preceded it.  Around 1973, Palmer conceived of a 16-part documentary about American popular music which, after considerable shopping around, he convinced Bernard Delfont of EMI to bankroll.  He proceeded to film over 300 interviews in approximately one million feet of film and was given access to archival footage of the same length.  Instead of writing a script, he enlisted the help of a dozen or so subject matter experts who wrote 2000-word essays that became the narration for each part.

John Lennon was a friend and mentor to Palmer during the production of the series, and its title is taken from the Lennon-penned 1967 Beatles song, "All You Need Is Love".  Although punk rock had entered the pop music scene while the series was being constructed, Palmer was refused the funding and time to include the genre in All You Need Is Love.

Episodes
The fifteen-hour-long documentary features interviews and performances (both archived and original footage) involving such notable acts as Bing Crosby, Bo Diddley, Jerry Lee Lewis, Elvis Presley, The Beatles, Bob Dylan, The Byrds, Leonard Cohen, Ike & Tina Turner and many others.

The series features a rare interview with the notoriously reclusive 1960s record producer Phil Spector. During his segment, a visibly intoxicated Spector performs an impromptu version of "Then I Kissed Her" solo and acoustic in his mansion home, a song which he originally wrote and produced for The Crystals in 1963. Palmer would later reveal that he had been coaxed into playing Russian roulette with Spector during the course of the evening.

The series features the only interview ever given by the mother of Beatles manager Brian Epstein. A tour of Harlem is given by John Hammond, the record executive who was instrumental in furthering the careers of Billie Holiday, Count Basie, Bob Dylan, Aretha Franklin and countless others.  Other musical figures featured include Rudi Blesh, Liberace, Eubie Blake, and Charles Aznavour.

A companion book authored by Palmer was released in 1976 by Grossman Publishers/Viking Press.  The book notes that the series was jointly produced by Theatre Projects Film Productions, EMI Television Productions and PolyGram.

A five-disc DVD of the series was released in 2008.

Reviews and criticism
The film's DVD release's cover cited reviews from a handful of noteworthy musicians: John Lennon called the film "A monumental achievement" and thanked Palmer for creating the series; Bing Crosby hailed its editing and deemed it a "priceless archive"; and Pete Seeger said that "its colossal emotional, intellectual and history range is breathtaking."

All You Need Is Love was given an "A" rating by Entertainment Weekly, called "a musical education in a box" by Blender, and Q Magazine reviewed it as "an impressive achievement, scholarly, opinionated and entertaining, seamlessly blending archive and fresh footage with an impressive cast of talking heads."

This documentary has been criticized for having a bias towards rock music. Disco music was completely ignored, as were most popular artists from the pre-rock music era who were not associated with being a precursor to rock music.

When the "Mighty Good: The Beatles" episode was given a Blu-ray release in 2013 Michael Dodd of Bring The Noise UK noted that it was intriguing how "in following the timeline of the band the film also establishes a kind of blueprint which every hugely successful rock act would follow", citing the accusations of selling out and moral panic of the "more popular than Jesus" incident.

References

External links

1977 British television series debuts
1977 British television series endings
Documentary television series about music
Films directed by Tony Palmer
1970s British documentary television series
ITV documentaries
Television series by ITV Studios
London Weekend Television shows
English-language television shows